Holland Township may refer to:

Canada
 Howland Township, Ontario

United States

Arkansas
 Holland Township, Saline County, Arkansas, in Saline County, Arkansas

Illinois
 Holland Township, Shelby County, Illinois

Iowa
 Holland Township, Sioux County, Iowa

Kansas
 Holland Township, Dickinson County, Kansas

Michigan
 Holland Township, Missaukee County, Michigan
 Holland Charter Township, Michigan in Ottawa County

Minnesota
 Holland Township, Kandiyohi County, Minnesota

Missouri
 Holland Township, Pemiscot County, Missouri

New Jersey
 Holland Township, New Jersey

South Dakota
 Holland Township, Douglas County, South Dakota, in Douglas County, South Dakota

Township name disambiguation pages